Easy to Take is a 1936 American comedy film directed by Glenn Tryon and written by Virginia Van Upp. The film stars Marsha Hunt, John Howard, Eugene Pallette, Richard Carle, Douglas Scott and Robert Greig. The film was released on November 6, 1936, by Paramount Pictures.

Plot

Cast 
Marsha Hunt as Donna Westlake
John Howard as Rodney Garfield
Eugene Pallette as Dr. Reginald Kraft aka Doc
Richard Carle as Attorney Olney
Douglas Scott as Wilbur Wentworth Westlake
Robert Greig as Judd 
Jan Duggan as Miss Higgie
Marilyn Knowlden as Gwen Ferry
Josephine Whittell as Mrs. Ferry
Carl Switzer as Alfred Bottle 
Charles Lane as Skip 
Billy Lee as Bill Ardmore Jr.

References

External links 
 

1936 films
Paramount Pictures films
American comedy films
1936 comedy films
Films directed by Glenn Tryon
American black-and-white films
1930s English-language films
1930s American films